Yevpatoria-Kurort is a railway station in Yevpatoria, Crimea, a territory recognized by a majority of countries as part of Ukraine, but de facto under control and administration of Russia.

History
The line Ostrakova — Evpatoria was opened in 1915 after 4 months of construction. During the Great Patriotic war the wooden station building was burned down. The current building was built in 1953 by architect Alexey Dushkin. In the 1970s and 1980s a locomotive depot, an electric shop, underpass and cash pavilion concourse were built behind the station. In 1974 the first electric train was inaugurated.

Photos

Trains
There are only 4 trains a day that terminate at the station:
 Simferopol — Yevpatoria

References

External links
 Train times on Yandex

Railway stations in Crimea
Railway stations in the Russian Empire opened in 1915
1915 establishments in the Russian Empire
1915 establishments in Ukraine